The men's national basketball team of the United States competed at the 2004 Summer Olympics in Athens, Greece. The team was led by future Basketball Hall of Fame head coach Larry Brown. Having won gold in the previous three straight Olympic Games, the Americans were favored to win Olympic gold again in 2004. However, the team won bronze, while losing three games against its opponents, the most games ever lost by a U.S. men's Olympic basketball team.

The team lost its opening game to Puerto Rico by 19 points, which stands as the largest margin of defeat for the U.S. in the Olympics. It ended their 24-game Olympic winning streak since 1992, when National Basketball Association (NBA) players were first allowed to compete. The team also lost games in the Olympics to Lithuania and Argentina. In addition, the team lost a friendly preparation game prior to the Olympics, against Italy, by a score of 95–78. This was the second time that Team USA won the bronze medal, having also done so at the 1988 Summer Olympics in Seoul.

Roster

After the United States finished in sixth place in the 2002 FIBA World Championship, the Americans overhauled their roster for the 2003 FIBA Tournament of the Americas in Puerto Rico, where they needed to qualify for the 2004 Summer Olympics. The team cruised to a first-place finish at the Americas Championship, and earned a spot in Athens, Greece, the following summer. However, the only players from the 2003 squad to compete in the Olympics were Tim Duncan, Allen Iverson, and Richard Jefferson; the rest of the team opted out. Newcomers to the team included young players LeBron James, Carmelo Anthony, Dwyane Wade, and Emeka Okafor. The team featured just one All-NBA selection (Duncan) and two All-Stars (Duncan and Iverson) from the prior NBA season, which are both all-time lows for a U.S. Olympic team since NBA players were first allowed in 1992. Team USA was coached by Larry Brown, who was coming off a championship in the 2004 NBA Finals.

Summary
The United States struggled with its outside shooting, finishing the tournament ranked last in three point field goals made (5.5 per game) and 11th in percentage (31.4) out of 12 teams. They also struggled defensively.

The team's loss to Puerto Rico was just the third in U.S. Olympic men's basketball history. Their two previous losses were both to the Soviet Union (1972 and 1988), with six having been the largest margin of defeat.

Statistical leaders

Records broken
Stephon Marbury scored 31 points and hit a record six three-pointers against Spain.
Team USA shot 12-of-22 (54.5 percent) 3-pointers in that same game.

References

External links
 USA Basketball, official site

United States at the Olympic men's basketball tournament
United States
Olympics